Patrick 'Pat' Passley (born 1965) is a retired British boxer.

Boxing career
Passley was the English National Champion in 1989, when boxing for the Lynn ABC he won the prestigious ABA super-heavyweight championship.

He represented England in the +91 kg super-heavyweight division, at the 1990 Commonwealth Games in Auckland, New Zealand.

He turned professional on 25 October 1994 and fought in 4 fights.

References

1965 births
Living people
British male boxers
Boxers at the 1990 Commonwealth Games
Super-heavyweight boxers
Commonwealth Games competitors for England